Nanny and the Professor is a 1972 American animated comedy TV movie based on the sitcom by the same name. The series' original cast reprised their roles from the live action series. Unlike in the television series, Nanny openly performs magic, while in the TV series it was only implied. The film was broadcast on September 30, 1972, as part of The ABC Saturday Superstar Movie.

A sequel followed the next year: Nanny and the Professor and the Phantom of the Circus, which also aired on The ABC Saturday Superstar Movie on November 17, 1973.

Voice cast
 Juliet Mills as Nanny
 Richard Long as Professor Harold Everett
 David Doremus as Hal Everett
 Kim Richards as Prudence Everett
 Trent Lehman as Butch Everett
 Joan Gerber as Aunt Henrietta

References

External links
 Nanny and the Professor at Internet Movie Database

1972 television films
1972 films
1972 comedy films
The ABC Saturday Superstar Movie
1970s American animated films
20th Century Fox Television films
1970s English-language films

pt:Nanny and the Professor